The Best of Missing Persons is a greatest hits album by the American new wave band Missing Persons, released in 1987. The first four tracks make up the entire Missing Persons EP, released in 1982 (Capitol Records DLP-15001). The remaining songs are from the band's first three studio albums and a non-album recording, their cover of "Hello, I Love You" originally by The Doors, which was included in the first pressing of the Missing Persons EP (1980), later included as a B-side to the "Words" single.

Track listing

Personnel

Missing Persons
 Dale Bozzio – vocals
 Terry Bozzio – vocals, keyboards, synthesizers, drums, percussion
 Warren Cuccurullo – guitar, vocals
 Patrick O'Hearn – electric & synthesized bass, keyboards, synthesizers
 Chuck Wild – synthesizer, keyboard (except for Color in Your Life tracks)

References

Missing Persons (band) albums
1987 greatest hits albums
Capitol Records compilation albums